Pachnephoptrus is a genus of leaf beetles in the subfamily Eumolpinae. It is distributed in Europe and Asia.

Species
 Pachnephoptrus cashmirensis (Jacoby, 1900)
 Pachnephoptrus indicus (Jacoby, 1895)
 Pachnephoptrus squamosus (Bryant, 1923)
 Pachnephoptrus weisei Reitter, 1892

References

Eumolpinae
Chrysomelidae genera
Beetles of Asia
Beetles of Europe
Taxa named by Edmund Reitter